François Pierre Delibes (born 1 August 1873, date of death unknown) was a French fencer. He competed in the individual masters foil and sabre events at the 1900 Summer Olympics.

References

External links
 

1873 births
Year of death missing
French male foil fencers
Olympic fencers of France
Fencers at the 1900 Summer Olympics
French male sabre fencers
Place of death missing
Sportspeople from Toulouse